Christopher P. Thomas (born 13 January 1947 in Perivale, Middlesex, England) is an English record producer who has worked extensively with the Beatles, Pink Floyd, Procol Harum, Roxy Music, Badfinger, Elton John, Paul McCartney, Pete Townshend, Pulp and the Pretenders. He has also produced breakthrough albums for the Sex Pistols, the Climax Blues Band and INXS.

Early life
Thomas was classically trained on the violin and piano as a child and he began playing bass in London pop bands, turning down at one point the opportunity to play with Jimi Hendrix and Mitch Mitchell before Hendrix had struck fame. After several years, Thomas decided that he had little interest in making a career as a performing musician. In a 1998 interview, he stated "I realized that being in a band you were dependent on all these other people, and I also knew that if I'd ever been successful in a band, I would've wanted to stay in the studio and just make the records; I wasn't that interested in playing live."

Recording sessions with the Beatles
Looking to break into production, Thomas wrote to Beatles producer George Martin seeking work and, in 1967, was employed as an assistant by AIR, an independent production company, which had been founded by Martin and three other EMI producers. Thomas was allowed to attend sessions at EMI Studios by the Hollies and, in 1968, the Beatles. He was there for much of the recording of the Beatles' self-titled double album (also known as the "White Album"). Midway through these sessions, Martin decided to take a holiday, and he proposed that Thomas continue working with the band in his absence. Thomas recalled: "I had just come back from holiday myself, and when I came in there was a little letter on the desk that said, "Dear Chris, Hope you had a nice holiday. I'm off on mine now. Make yourself available to The Beatles. Neil and Mal know you're coming down."

Thomas produced (without credit) "Birthday" and "Happiness Is a Warm Gun". He also played keyboards on four songs from The White Album: harpsichord on "Piggies", mellotron on "The Continuing Story of Bungalow Bill", and piano on "Long, Long, Long" and "Savoy Truffle".

Early production credits
Thomas was not credited as producer or co-producer on The Beatles, although his name appears as co-producer on some of the original session sheets. By the end of 1968, he had received his first solo credit: The Climax Chicago Blues Band by the Climax Blues Band.

Procol Harum would be the first band with which Thomas would enjoy a steady working relationship, producing their albums Home, Broken Barricades and Procol Harum Live: In Concert with the Edmonton Symphony Orchestra during 1970–71. Thomas subsequently travelled to Los Angeles to produce Christopher Milk's 1972 album Some People Will Drink Anything (Warner Bros/Reprise), and met John Cale, who invited Thomas to produce his Paris 1919. At the sessions with Procol, Thomas met Roxy Music singer-songwriter Bryan Ferry, who asked him to produce the band's second album, For Your Pleasure. The collaboration continued for the next four albums (Stranded, Country Life, Siren and Viva!).

Recording sessions with Pink Floyd
In 1973, as Thomas' work continued to attract interest, he took on mixing duties with Pink Floyd for their The Dark Side of the Moon album. "I came in at the end," he said. "I'd heard the band sent the tapes off to four different people to mix, so they could choose their favourite mix. I thought this was a weird idea, especially as they had worked on it for such a long time and had been producing it themselves. I understood they wanted someone to give opinions on whether something worked or not. But to take the tapes away and mix it? I said, 'I definitely don't want to do that.' So, in the end, they finally came in and we mixed it altogether at Abbey Road."

In his Mix interview, Thomas claimed he would finish work on the Floyd album at midnight and drive to AIR Studios to do more work on Procol Harum's Grand Hotel album until 5 am. Thomas got involved after David Gilmour, Rick Wright, Roger Waters and Nick Mason could not agree how the album should be mixed: Waters and Mason wanted a dry and clean mix, using the nonmusical elements, while Gilmour and Wright wanted a more subtle mix, with an emphasis on echo. Wright denied that there were any violent arguments.

In 1993, Gilmour described Thomas' role on as a referee for arguments between himself and Waters: "[We] argued so much that it was suggested we get a third opinion. We were going to leave Chris to mix it on his own, with Alan Parsons engineering. And, of course, on the first day I found out that Roger sneaked in there. So the second day I sneaked in there. And from then on, we both sat right at Chris's shoulder, interfering. But luckily, Chris was more sympathetic to my point of view than he was to Roger's."

Gilmour's recollections are disputed by Thomas: "There was no difference in opinion between them. I don't remember Roger once saying that he wanted less echo. In fact, there were never any hints that they were later going to fall out. It was a very creative atmosphere. A lot of fun."

"The overall sound was pretty much dictated by what was on the multitracks," observed engineer Alan Parsons. "I don't think the mix necessarily revolutionised what was there. If you were to play the multitrack tape now and put the faders up, it would sound like the Dark Side of the Moon we all know. So, no, I wasn't aware of any conflict of that kind. But the plus side of Chris being brought in was in solving any problems between the band at the time of mixing. He was like a mentor, a guiding light and intermediary."

In any event, Thomas's involvement resulted in both Waters and Gilmour being satisfied with the final release. He also synchronised the echo on "Us and Them" and was at the session for "The Great Gig in the Sky".

Recording sessions with Badfinger
Thomas produced a trio of albums for power pop group Badfinger on the tail end of their career, beginning with 1973's Ass, and 1974's Badfinger and Wish You Were Here albums. Ass was originally recorded with Badfinger producing, but the group later admitted they were incapable of producing themselves. Members Pete Ham and Tom Evans solicited Thomas' help in cleaning up existing recordings and laying down new tracks. Although the succeeding album Badfinger retained Thomas from the outset and was considered by critics to be an improvement in production, neither album was successful in the marketplace. 

For their third project together, Thomas held a meeting with the group and pleaded that they all concentrate on making the best record they could muster. It turned out that Wish You Were Here garnered the most positive critical response from periodicals, including Rolling Stone magazine.

Recording sessions with the Sex Pistols
In 1976, he was asked by Malcolm McLaren to produce the Sex Pistols. Thomas' colleagues in the recording industry were horrified by his involvement with the Sex Pistols, particularly when he found himself producing the band at the same time as he was working with Paul McCartney. His work with the band also led to one of his most curious album credits. Co-producer Bill Price explained:

During the media furore over the single God Save the Queen, Thomas, Price and Sex Pistols' vocalist Johnny Rotten were subject to a razor attack outside a pub in Highbury, London.

In 2007, Thomas produced a brand new studio recording of "Pretty Vacant" for use in the new video game Skate. John Lydon, Steve Jones and Paul Cook all play on this new version, which was recorded in Los Angeles in July 2007. Neither of the original bass players, Glen Matlock or Sid Vicious were present (Vicious had died in 1979).

Work with other artists
Thomas also programmed Moog synthesizer on David Bowie's first two albums, the song "Son of My Father" by Chicory Tip, Leonard Cohen's Songs of Love and Hate, and Elton John's eponymous album. He also programmed and played Moog synthesiser on George Harrison's All Things Must Pass and the theme from The Persuaders! by John Barry. In 1979, Thomas produced Wings' final album Back to the Egg, as bandleader Paul McCartney was looking for a more (and then current) new wave or punk oriented production style. 

In 1985, Thomas played a critical part in achieving a worldwide breakthrough for the Australian band INXS. The band's keyboardist and main songwriter Andrew Farriss stated that the band had "already finished the Listen Like Thieves album, but Chris Thomas told us there was still no 'hit'. We left the studio that night knowing we had one day left and we had to deliver 'a hit'. Talk about pressure." Thomas recalls he was worried that the standard of songs the band had laid down was not as strong as he wished. Thomas then went on to produce the follow up album, 1987's Kick, which became INXS' most successful album of their career. He also produced 1990's X.

Thomas was a fundamental part of the Pretenders' success, producing The Pretenders' first (self-titled) album in 1980, the second album Pretenders II in 1981 and their third effort, Learning to Crawl (1984), and all singles in between; his work on Learning to Crawl earned him the nickname on the liner notes of the "fifth Pretender". He returned on their 1994 success, Last of the Independents, co-producing one track "I'm A Mother" with Ian Stanley.

Thomas has won Rolling Stone Critics "Producer of the Year", Billboard "Producer of the Year", plus Grammy and Brit Awards.

Production credits

Singles produced by Thomas include:

 "Street Life", "Love Is the Drug" by Roxy Music
 "Let's Stick Together" by Bryan Ferry
 "Be Good to Yourself" by Frankie Miller
 "Anarchy in the U.K.", "God Save the Queen", "Pretty Vacant", "Holidays in the Sun" by The Sex Pistols
 "Brass in Pocket", "Talk of the Town", "I Go to Sleep", "Back on the Chain Gang" by The Pretenders
 "Let My Love Open the Door", "Face the Face" by Pete Townshend
 "Blue Eyes", "I'm Still Standing", "I Guess That's Why They Call It the Blues", "Sacrifice", "Can You Feel the Love Tonight", "Circle of Life" by Elton John
 "What You Need", "Need You Tonight", "Never Tear Us Apart", "Suicide Blonde", "Disappear" by INXS
 "Stay" by Shakespears Sister
 "All for Love" by Bryan Adams, Rod Stewart and Sting
 "Common People" by Pulp

Albums produced or mixed by Thomas include:

 1968: The Climax Chicago Blues Band by Climax Blues Band, The Beatles by The Beatles
 1969: Climax Blues Band Plays On by Climax Blues Band, Abbey Road by The Beatles
 1970: A Lot of Bottle by Climax Blues Band, Home by Procol Harum
 1971: Tightly Knit by Climax Blues Band, Mick Abrahams by Mick Abrahams
 1972: Some People Will Drink Anything by Christopher Milk, At Last by Mick Abrahams Band, keyboard player on Son of My Father by Chicory Tip 1973: For Your Pleasure by Roxy Music, Stranded by Roxy Music, Grand Hotel by Procol Harum, Paris 1919 by John Cale, Ass by Badfinger, The Dark Side of the Moon (mixing) by Pink Floyd
 1974: Badfinger by Badfinger, Wish You Were Here by Badfinger, Exotic Birds and Fruit by Procol Harum, Kurofune (aka Black Ship) by Sadistic Mika Band, Country Life by Roxy Music
 1975: Siren by Roxy Music, Hot Menu!  by Sadistic Mika Band
 1976: Viva! by Roxy Music, Let's Stick Together by Bryan Ferry
 1976: Full House by Frankie Miller
 1977: Hurt by Chris Spedding
 1977: Never Mind the Bollocks by the Sex Pistols
 1978: Power in the Darkness by Tom Robinson Band
 1979: Back to the Egg by Wings
 1980: Pretenders by The Pretenders; Empty Glass by Pete Townshend
 1981: Pretenders II by The Pretenders, The Fox by Elton John
 1982: All the Best Cowboys Have Chinese Eyes by Pete Townshend, Jump Up! by Elton John
 1983: Too Low for Zero by Elton John
 1984: Hysteria by The Human League
 1984: Learning to Crawl by The Pretenders; Breaking Hearts by Elton John
 1985: Listen Like Thieves by INXS; White City by Pete Townshend
 1987: Kick by INXS
 1988: Reg Strikes Back by Elton John; Live Nude Guitars by Brian Setzer
 1989: Sleeping with the Past by Elton John
 1990: X by INXS
 1992: The One by Elton John
 1994: Last of the Independents by The Pretenders, The Lion King soundtrack, Jewel by Marcella Detroit, The Division Bell by Pink Floyd (mixing)
 1995: Different Class by Pulp
 1996: Filthy Lucre Live by Sex Pistols
 1997: The Big Picture by Elton John
 1998: This Is Hardcore by Pulp
 1999: Run Devil Run by Paul McCartney
 2001: Or8? by Hoggboy
 2004: How to Dismantle an Atomic Bomb by U2
 2006: On an Island by David Gilmour; Razorlight by Razorlight
 2010: Serotonin by Mystery Jets
 2013: Snapshot'' by The Strypes

References

Works cited

External links
 Chris Thomas interview (Mix magazine, 1998)
 Interview and feature on Chris Thomas (podcast hosted by Beatles biographer Robert Rodriguez, December 2018)

1947 births
Brit Award winners
English bass guitarists
English keyboardists
English male guitarists
English record producers
Grammy Award winners
Living people
Male bass guitarists
Musicians from London
People educated at Latymer Upper School
People from Perivale